Uwe Plank (born 16 December 1939) is a German equestrian. He competed in two events at the 1968 Summer Olympics.

References

1939 births
Living people
German male equestrians
Olympic equestrians of East Germany
Equestrians at the 1968 Summer Olympics
Sportspeople from Saxony-Anhalt